1575 Winifred, provisional designation , is a stony Phocaea asteroid and slow rotator from the inner regions of the asteroid belt, approximately 9.5 kilometers in diameter.

It was discovered on 20 April 1950, by astronomer Robert Curry Cameron of Indiana University during the Indiana Asteroid Program at Goethe Link Observatory in Indiana, United States. It was named after Winifred Cameron, an astronomer at the United States Naval Observatory.

Orbit and classification 

The stony S-type asteroid is a member of the Phocaea family, a group of asteroids with similar orbital characteristics, named after the family's namesake 25 Phocaea. It orbits the Sun at a distance of 1.9–2.8 AU once every 3 years and 8 months (1,336 days). Its orbit has an eccentricity of 0.18 and an inclination of 25° with respect to the ecliptic.

Physical characteristics

Rotational lightcurve 

In July 2009, a rotational lightcurve was obtained for this asteroid from photometric observations taken by American astronomer Brian D. Warner at his Palmer Divide Observatory in Colorado. The result supersedes a previous observation by French astronomer Laurent Bernasconi from May 2005, that gave a similar, yet less accurate period of 129 hours, and with a smaller amplitude of 0.51 in magnitude.

Diameter and albedo 

According to the surveys carried out by the Infrared Astronomical Satellite, IRAS, and NASA's Wide-field Infrared Survey Explorer with its subsequent NEOWISE mission, Winifred has an albedo of 0.24 to 0.25 and a diameter between 9.3 and 10.7 kilometers, while the Collaborative Asteroid Lightcurve Link derives a higher albedo of 0.31 and a diameter of 9.5 kilometers with an absolute magnitude of 12.0.

Naming 

This minor planet was named for a staff member of the United States Naval Observatory in Washington D.C., Winifred Sawtell Cameron. The official  was proposed by the discovering astronomer and published by the Minor Planet Center in December 1952.

References

External links 
 Lightcurve plot of 1575 Winifred, Palmer Divide Observatory, B. D. Warner (2009)
 Asteroid Lightcurve Database (LCDB), query form (info )
 Dictionary of Minor Planet Names, Google books
 Asteroids and comets rotation curves, CdR – Observatoire de Genève, Raoul Behrend
 Discovery Circumstances: Numbered Minor Planets (1)-(5000) – Minor Planet Center
 
 

001575
001575
Named minor planets
001575
19500420